{{Infobox television
| alt_name             = 
| image                = The £100K Drop.jpg
| genre                = Game show
| presenter            = 
| theme_music_composer = Marc Sylvan
| country              = United Kingdom
| language             = English
| num_series           = 
| num_episodes         = 
| runtime              = 60–120 minutes (inc. adverts)
| company              = Remarkable Television
| location             = 3 Mills Studios (2010–15)Dock10 (2018–19)
| distributor          = Banijay
| channel              = Channel 4
| picture_format       = 576i 16:9 (SDTV)
| first_aired          = Original series: – £100K Drop: – 
| last_aired           = 
}}The £100K Drop (formerly known as The Million Pound Drop and The Million Pound Drop Live) is a British game show which was broadcast on Channel 4 in the United Kingdom. The show was first aired on 24 May 2010 and was presented by Davina McCall

The show used social networking sites (such as Facebook and Twitter) to advertise the show as well as to find contestants. David Flynn, managing director of Endemol's Remarkable Television, which produced the show, said: "The plan was to create buzz and an air of mystery around the show by trickling information about auditions via Twitter and Facebook, giving fans a level of exclusivity."

After a three-year hiatus the series returned in a daily afternoon slot in May 2018 but with a reduced prize fund of £100,000 and with a new name, namely The £100K Drop, and McCall reprising her role. The new format presented three series totalling 120 episodes. The show was cancelled in December 2019.

Format

Gameplay
Contestants, alone or in pairs for the first series, or only in pairs from the second to the ninth series, are given £1,000,000 in £50 notes at the start of the show, banded in 40 bundles of £25,000 each. Contestants are presented with multiple-choice questions, mostly either general knowledge, or focused on current or recent events (even events that occur during the airing of the show) with the words of "this week", "today" even "right now", to accentuate the fact that the show is broadcast live.

The contestants choose one of two categories at the beginning of each round. If they take too long to choose, a coin is flipped to decide. Each answer option corresponds to a different trapdoor or "drop"; only one answer is correct. The contestants have a set length of time to distribute all the money among the drops as they see fit, but they must leave at least one drop "clear", with no money on it. Any money not placed on a drop when time runs out is forfeited, and contestants who place money on every drop typically face immediate elimination, except on some international versions of the show. The contestants may stop the timer early if they are satisfied with their choice of answers.

After the timer either runs out or is stopped, the drops for the incorrect answers are opened. Any money placed on them falls down a chute and is removed from play by security guards beneath the stage, while any money placed on the correct answer is carried forward to the next question. This process is repeated until the contestants either run out of money and lose, or answer the final question correctly and keep all remaining money.

The time limit and number of answers per question vary over the course of the game as follows:

Other games
For the 2010 Christmas specials, any contestants who lost all their money and would otherwise have left empty-handed were presented with multiple doors corresponding to bonus prizes. The contestants would choose which door they wanted and would win what was 'behind' that door. From the 2011 Christmas specials onwards, a new feature was introduced to allow online players to compete against one another. Additionally, a counter was added to the display screen for each drop to indicate how much money had been placed on it, eliminating the need for manual counting.

On 2 January 2012, as part of the Channel 4 Mash-up, Davina McCall played the game with Andrew, her father; the show was hosted by Phil Spencer from Location, Location, Location.  A second Channel 4 Mash-up happened in 2013, the show this time being hosted by Alan Carr.

2013 changes
Significant changes to the format were made in summer 2013 for the tenth series. Teams of four, rather than just being strictly pairs, can now play the game. At each question, the player(s) can swap positions with their teammates – two backstage watching, the other two answering the questions onstage. Unlike previous series, there are now just seven questions and no question categories (if a team is playing); with the first three questions having four answers, the next three questions had three answers, and a seventh and a final (eighth) question with only two.

Contestants who answer the seventh question correctly are shown two possible answers for a "Final Drop" question, and may choose to attempt it or leave with their winnings. A miss on the Final Drop forfeits all winnings, while a correct answer doubles the total for a maximum potential prize of £2,000,000.

2014 changes 
Starting from summer 2014, contestants could play as individuals again after four years. Prior to that, only Gemma in the very first UK series (as well as five contestants in the Chinese version) had played the Drop as individuals in their countries. The show's title was rebranded to The Million Pound Drop. The series was the first to be pre-recorded due to time constraints.

2018 revival: The £100K Drop
On 14 July 2017, it was announced that the programme would be returning in the daily afternoon slot of 2018, but with a lower prize fund of £100,000 in £10 notes (40 bundles of £2,500 each), and with the name of the show changing to The £100K Drop. McCall reprised her hosting role, and the series format was similar to the 2013 format with only seven questions, with a reduced 45-second timer for the last four questions. The revival ran for three series, the first with 60 episodes, and the last two with 30 episodes each, both broadcast in 2019.

Production
Prior to taping of each episode, all audience members, studio personnel and contestants must pass a security clearance. They must also sign a non-disclosure agreement and turn in possessions such as mobile phones and small bags, to be returned after taping is complete. Security officers are present in the studio to safeguard the bundles used in the game, which contain actual cash obtained from an undisclosed bank within the United Kingdom.

Episodes usually last between 60 and 90 minutes, although the last episode of the series may end slightly sooner or later depending on the contestants' performance. On 23 June 2012, for the first time in the show's history, the episode was extended to 120 minutes. The following week's episode on 30 June 2012 was 100 minutes.

Interactivity
As the show is broadcast live, viewers are encouraged to play along on their smartphones via the iOS and Android apps, or on the Channel 4 website.  Aggregated statistics of the audience performance appear on screen during the broadcast and being read out by McCall. Online players receive no prize money but are sometimes given the chance to apply to be on the show. Bookmakers also take bets on which stage of the game the contestants will leave and how much money will still be in play at various stage of the game. Often on the show, if there is a question relating to a particular online source, Davina will announce that the website in question has crashed due to a large number of online players looking up the answers. Later series added the show's application for them to play on their tablets. The interactivity is provided by London second screen company Monterosa.

In 2011, The Million Pound Drop became the first TV show to serve a second screen advert to the online playing audience. It was a 3-minute video featuring rapper Tinie Tempah. The full advert was watched by 20% of the online playing audience according to Dean Donaldson, Global Head of Media Innovation at DG, responsible for the technology.

The last few series of the show were not broadcast live.

Celebrity contestants
Since series two, celebrity contestants regularly appear on the show playing for charity. Celebrity contestants that lose their whole £1,000,000 are given £5,000 for their charities.

Spin-offs

The Channel 4 Mash-up
On 2 January 2012, a special version of the show aired as part of The Channel 4 Mash-up. The special edition was hosted by Phil Spencer and featured Davina and her father, Andrew, as contestants. This special edition was not broadcast live, as the show usually is, but instead was shown in three pre-recorded 20 minute chunks spread throughout the 'mash-up night' at 18:35, 19:55 and 21:40. Davina and her father made it through to the final question with £50,000, but was not won.

The show returned on 4 January 2013 with Alan Carr as host.

Stand Up to Cancer
On 19 October 2012, a special version aired live as part of Channel 4's UK telethon, Stand Up to Cancer. For this show, the million pounds was doubled (thus making it The Two Million Pound Drop) and a special 16-player celebrity relay team took on the drop for cancer-related charities. A different pair of celebrities handled each question, with the show airing in two segments — questions 1 to 4 at 21:00 and questions 5–8 were later in the evening. Each pair was given just 30 seconds, instead of the usual 60 seconds, for their question.

McCall switched back and forth between the live telethon, hosted alongside Alan Carr and Dr Christian Jessen, and the two Drop segments. The celebrity relay banked £200,000 for Stand Up to Cancer, with the final four pairs wagering the entire amount on a single answer on each question. This special was included in the ninth series of the show (as that series was in progress), unlike the Channel 4 'mash-up' which was a separate edition.

Other media 
On July 9, 2021, Estonian live casino game developers Playtech released a licensed live casino game show game called the Money Drop Live on PC and mobile devices. The game is led by a live host and is designed to look and feel like the original Channel 4 show, featuring official branding.

Players are first tasked with betting on the outcome of a 54-segment wheel of fortune, if they guess correctly they will receive a cash prize which they must then risk by spreading it across four trapdoors. If the money falls it is lost, the same as in the television show. If players bet on the right trapdoor then the money is theirs to keep. The higher the value of the overall prize on the line, the more rounds the player must compete in to win it.

Critical reception

Ratings
The series' highest-rated episode was 4 February 2011, which was seen by 2.79 million viewers and received a 14.4% share. Ratings for series 10 dropped but remained respectable; the first episode (14 June 2013) was seen by 1.57 million viewers and received a 7.6% share.

Incident
During an episode on 5 November 2010, contestants Johnny and Dee were faced with the options Sylvester McCoy, Paul McGann, Christopher Eccleston and David Tennant. They were then asked "Who played Dr Who for the longest period?". The contestants did not know the answer so decided to split their remaining £650,000 between McCoy and McGann. The answer was then revealed to be Tennant—who played the Doctor from 2005 to 2010—and they lost all their remaining money. However, viewers began to query the accuracy of this question, saying it was open to interpretation as McCoy played the Doctor from 1987 to 1989, but also appeared at the beginning of the Doctor Who television film in 1996, making his time playing the character technically nine years uninterrupted. After the producers spoke to BBC, they were informed that McCoy was actually the correct answer. Channel 4 then announced that Johnny and Dee were allowed to return to the show to continue with the £325,000 that would have remained on an episode aired on 12 November 2010; they would go on to win £25,000.

Merchandise
A board game was released by Drumond Park in November 2010.

Transmissions

The Million Pound Drop

Christmas specials

Celebrity Games

The £100K Drop

Notes
On 2 January 2012 and 4 January 2013, two special programmes aired as part of The Channel 4 Mash-up.
Celebrity Games was the first time a series had been pre-recorded.
The eleventh series onwards was pre-recorded, while it was also the first pre-recorded regular series.

International versions
Legend:  Currently airing    No longer airing    Future version   Non-broadcast pilot 

Notes::
While most international versions of the Million Pound Drop adopted the original British version format, some versions (such as the American version) adopt an entirely new format, featuring a new set and a title theme, and is played with 50 bundles instead of 40. The new format is still acquired by Endemol.
The two Chinese versions are produced without Endemol's permission. The first Chinese version featured iPads each displaying a travel destination of a country instead of cash bundles, and teams can win up to 50 travel destinations for a perfect game.
According to Endemol, the format has recently sold to Niger, but all the exact information is unknown yet.
Arturo Valls hosted an episode as a cross-over between Atrapa un millón and his own game show Ahora caigo, which was hosted by Carlos Sobera on that afternoon.
Though the Thai version's top prize is in Thai baht, the cash on the stage is instead presented as United States dollars, equivalent to top prize money. From August 8, 2015 to March 11, 2017, the Thai version offered a Toyota Vios car key (which is worth ) as an additional prize. If the team win the game with the key box intact, they will also win the car.
Russian, Ukrainian and Kazakhstan versions are filmed in Moscow (Gorky Film Studio) under the production by Weit Media. Although they are using Russian language (including Belarusian version) as their conversation language, however, the Ukrainian and Kazakhstan (only first season by the host) versions used native language for the introduction, greeting and closing caption. The Ukrainian and Kazakhstan (first season only) versions also offered the SMS interactive game during the program. Unlike Russian, Belarusian, Kazakh version which are using Russian for the questions, Ukrainian version preferred to use Ukrainian for questions instead.
This is not included in the franchise because the game was actually played as a segment, rather than a full show.

Notes

References

External links
 
 
 
 

2010 British television series debuts
2019 British television series endings
2010s British game shows
Channel 4 game shows
Endemol Shine Group franchises
English-language television shows
Television series by Banijay
British television series revived after cancellation